Heleanna physalodes is a moth of the family Tortricidae first described by Edward Meyrick in 1926. It is found in the Chagos Archipelago, Sri Lanka, Guam, Micronesia and Fiji.

Larval host plants are Barringtonia, Cordia, species.

Subspecies
Three subspecies are recorded.

Heleanna physalodes abundantia Clarke, 1976
Heleanna physalodes elitha Clarke, 1976
Heleanna physalodes tricia Clarke, 1976

References

External links
A new avocado pest in Central America (Lepidoptera: Tortricidae) with a key to Lepidoptera larvae threatening avocados in California
Notes on the Tortricidae (Lepidoptera) of Fiji, with descriptions of a new species and a new subspecies
Low host specificity and abundance of frugivorous Lepidoptera in the lowland rain forests of Papua New Guinea

Moths of Asia
Moths described in 1926